Alex Rodriguez (born 1975) is an American Major League Baseball player.

Alex Rodriguez or Alexander Rodriguez may also refer to:

 Álex Rodríguez (film editor) (born 1971), Mexican film editor
 Alex Rodriguez (musician), US musician
 Alex Rodriguez (Andorran footballer) (born 1980), Andorran footballer
 Álex Rodríguez (Panamanian footballer) (born 1990), Panamanian football goalkeeper
 Alex Rodríguez (Spanish footballer) (born 1993), Spanish football player who plays for Oxford United
 Alexander Rodríguez (gymnast) (born 1985), Puerto Rican gymnast
 Alexander Rodríguez (cyclist), Colombian cyclist and competitor in the 2001 Vuelta a Colombia

See also
 Alex Rodriguez Park at Mark Light Field, a baseball stadium on the University of Miami campus in Coral Gables, Florida